Joshua Mori (born 1 April 1997), is a professional footballer who plays as a winger. Before signing his first professional contract in 2022, he won the National Premier Leagues SA golden boot and made the team of the year. Mori made his professional debut on 11 November 2022 for Adelaide United against Melbourne Victory as a substitute in a 3–0 win.

Personal life
Joshua is the son of former professional footballer Damian Mori.

References

External links

1997 births
Living people
Australian soccer players
Association football midfielders
Adelaide City FC players
Adelaide Raiders SC players
FK Beograd (Australia) players
Adelaide United FC players
National Premier Leagues players
A-League Men players